José Alfredo Bea García (born October 14, 1969) is a Spanish sprint canoer and marathon canoeist who competed from the early 1990s to the mid-2000s (decade). He won a silver medal in the C-2 1000 m event at the 2001 ICF Canoe Sprint World Championships in Poznań.

Bea competed in four Summer Olympics, earning his best finish of fourth in the C-2 500 m event at Sydney in 2000.

References

Sports-reference.com profile

1969 births
Canoeists at the 1992 Summer Olympics
Canoeists at the 1996 Summer Olympics
Canoeists at the 2000 Summer Olympics
Canoeists at the 2004 Summer Olympics
Living people
Olympic canoeists of Spain
Spanish male canoeists
ICF Canoe Sprint World Championships medalists in Canadian